COVID-19 hospital may refer to:

COVID-19 hospitals in the United Kingdom
Fangcang hospital
Hospital ships designated for the COVID-19 pandemic

See also
Impact of the COVID-19 pandemic on hospitals
:Category:Hospitals established for the COVID-19 pandemic